Nasvadi is name of a town, a village as well as a Taluka in Chhota Udaipur district of Gujarat, India.

History

Princely State

Before independence, during British India, Nasvadi was a Princely State of India, ruled by Hindu rulers of Solanki clan of Rajputs. The princely state of Nasvadi was spread over an area of 51 km2. Nasvadi was a tributary state under Gaekwads of Baroda

Present status

Taluka

At present Nasvadi is name of a Taluka of Chota Udaipur District of Gujarat, which has 220 villages under its jurisdiction. It used to be a part of the Vadodara District. But after the formation of new Chhota Udaipur district on 26 January 2013 for decentralisation, it joined the new district. The taluka has State Bank of India Branch and also other public sector banks. It also has private banks.

Village

Nasvadi is also name of a village in the Taluka, which is 1.6 km from Taluka Head office, which incidentally also is known by name of Nasvadi (town)

People

There is a family that also has a last name of Nasvadi but don't live there but in America! They love to cook and are a very ice family and play games together all the time. Mikey has 4 kids and they are all teenagers 0-0.

Town

Nasvadi town, the Taluka headquarters, is 71 km from Vadodara. It is 173 km from its State capital Gandhinagar.

References

Villages in Chhota Udaipur district
Princely states of India
Cities and towns in Chhota Udaipur district